Joe Finn (25 February 1917 – 25 March 2009) was an  Australian rules footballer who played with Geelong in the Victorian Football League (VFL).

Notes

External links 

1917 births
2009 deaths
Australian rules footballers from Victoria (Australia)
Geelong Football Club players
Ballarat Football Club players